The Maguire family is an Irish clan based in County Fermanagh. The name derives from the Gaelic , which is "son of Odhar" meaning "dun", "dark one". According to legend, this relates to the eleventh descendant of Colla da Chrich, great-grandson of Cormac mac Airt, who was monarch of Ireland about the middle of the third century. From the 13th to the 17th centuries, the Maguire’s were kings of Fermanagh.

Naming conventions

The surname has been anglicized variously as McGuire, McGwire, McGwyre and most commonly, Maguire (from variant Irish spelling Mag Uidhir).

History
The Maguire sept is primarily associated with modern-day County Fermanagh. They possessed the entire county, also known as Maguire's Country, from about 1250 C.E. and maintained their independence as Lords of Fermanagh down to the reign of King James VI & I, when their country was confiscated like other parts of Ulster. The Maguire’s supplied Chiefs or Princes to Fermanagh, from about A.D. 1264, when they supplanted the former Chieftains (Ó Daimhín, or Devin/Devine). They were inaugurated as Princes of Fermanagh on the summit of Cuilcagh, a magnificent mountain near Swanlinbar, on the borders of Cavan and Fermanagh; and sometimes also at a place called Sciath Gabhra or Lisnasciath, now Lisnaskea. The family was first mentioned in the Annals as early as 956 AD and have always been closely associated with the other leading septs of Ulster such as the O'Neill and the O'Donnell. They spawned several well-known branches which became septs in their own right, including Mac Manus, Mac Caffrey, Mac Hugh, and several others. The name is among the forty most common names in Ireland, among the top twenty-five in Ulster, ten in Co. Cavan, thirty in Co. Monaghan and is the single most common name in Co. Fermanagh. Maguiresbridge in Co. Fermanagh (Irish: Droichead Mhig Uidhir) takes its name from the family.

In the Nine Years' War (1594–1603), Hugh Maguire, the Lord of Fermanagh, took the rebels' side, while his subordinate kinsman Connor Roe Maguire of Magherastephana sought to displace him and was nicknamed "the Queen's Maguire" for his support of Queen Elizabeth's forces. Connor was granted the whole of Maguire's Country (Fermanagh) by letters patent in 1601, but this was disregarded by the Plantation of Ulster in 1609, which granted him only twelve thousand acres of the barony of Magherastephana. Connor's son Bryan was made Baron Maguire of Enniskillen in 1627; both of his sons supported the Confederate Ireland rebellion of the 1640s. Connor, 2nd Baron was executed and attainted in 1645, while Rory Maguire was killed in fighting in 1648. Rory's son, Roger Maguire, was a Jacobite politician and soldier. During translation in the Ulster Plantation, various English translations of the original Mag Uidhir appeared, including Maguire, Mac Guire and McGuire. In South West Donegal, the name is re-translated into Gaelic as Mac Guibhir. An unusual version is Meguiar, an American spelling best known from "Meguiar's Wax."

Enniskillen Castle was the medieval seat of the Maguire (Mag Uidhir), chieftains of Fermanagh, who policed the lough with a private navy of 1,500 boats. Nearby is Maguiresbridge. At the castle, the King got wind of a large army that had been sent to attack.  Fearing the loss of all his clan, he sent half of his people to the northwest of Scotland, who adopted the surname of MacQuarrie.

Notable People
 Andrew Maguire (born 1939), American politician and former member of U.S. House of Representatives from New Jersey
 Baron Maguire, Two Barons Maguire of Enniskillen in the Peerage of Ireland
 Bassett Maguire (1904–1991), American botanist
 Bernard A. Maguire (1818–1886), American Jesuit and president of Georgetown University
 Father Bob Maguire (born c. 1935), Australian priest and community worker; awarded the Order of Australia 1989
 Brendan Maguire (born 1975) Canadian Politician, MLA for Nova Scotia.
 Cathy Maguire, Irish singer-songwriter, TV personality from Dundalk, Co Louth.
 Charles A. Maguire (1876–1949), Canadian politician; mayor of Toronto 1922–1923
 Chris Maguire (born 1989), Scottish footballer
 Clare Maguire (born 1988), British singer-songwriter
 Connor Maguire, 2nd Baron of Enniskillen, Irish rebel of 1641
 Darragh Maguire (born 1976), Irish footballer
 Donna Maguire (born 1967), Provisional IRA member
 Eleanor Maguire, Irish neuropsychologist
 Emily Maguire (disambiguation), multiple people
 Frank Maguire (1929–1981), Northern Ireland politician and MP
 Gavin Maguire (born 1967), Welsh footballer
 George Maguire (born 1990), Olivier Award-winning English actor
 George Maguire (1796–1882), Irish-American mayor of St. Louis, Missouri, USA
 Gerard Maguire (born 1945), Australian actor
 Gregory Maguire (born 1954), American author
 Harold Maguire (1912–2001), Director-General of Intelligence at the British Ministry of Defence
 Harry Maguire (born 1993), English footballer
 Harry Maguire (sailor), (born 1928), Irish Olympian
 Hugh Maguire (Lord of Fermanagh) (died 1600), Lord of Fermanagh in Ireland during the reign of Elizabeth
 Hugh Maguire (violinist) (1927–2013), Irish violinist
 Jack Maguire (baseball) (1925–2001), American baseball player
 James G. Maguire (1853–1920), American politician; U.S. representative from California
 Jeff Maguire (born 1952), American film screenwriter
 John A. Maguire (1870–1939), American politician from Nebraska
 John Aloysius Maguire (1851–1920), Catholic Archbishop of Glasgow, Scotland
 John Norman Maguire (born 1956), Australian cricketer
 John Maguire (disambiguation), multiple people
 Jon Maguire, songwriter and producer
 Joseph Maguire (contemporary), U.S. Navy rear admiral, Commander of the Naval Special Warfare Command
 Joseph Francis Maguire (1919–2014), American Catholic bishop
 Josh Maguire (born 1980), Australian soccer player
 Kathleen Maguire (1925–1989), American actress
 Kevin Maguire (born 1960), American comic book artist
 Kristin Maguire, American politician and former chairman of the South Carolina State Board of Education
 Larry Maguire (born 1949), Canadian politician and activist farmer in Manitoba; representative in the Manitoba legislature
 Leona Maguire (born 1994), Irish golfer, twin of Lisa
 Lisa Maguire (born 1994), Irish golfer, twin of Leona
 Máiread Corrigan-Maguire (born 1944), Northern Irish peace activist
 Marian Maguire (born 1962), New Zealand lithographer
 Martie Maguire (born 1969), American country music songwriter and singer; founding member of the Dixie Chicks
 Mary Maguire (1919–1974), born Hélène Teresa Maguire, Australian actress
 Matt Maguire (born 1984), Australian rules footballer
 Michael Maguire (disambiguation), multiple people
 Paul Maguire (born 1938), American football player and sportscaster
 Robert Maguire (1921–2005), American illustrator
 Roger Maguire (1641–1708), Irish Jacobite soldier and official
 Rory Maguire (soldier) (1619–1648), Irish rebel soldier
 Sam Maguire (1879–1927), Irish republican and Gaelic footballer; eponym of the Sam Maguire Cup
 Sarah Maguire (1957–2017), British poet
 Sharon Maguire (born 1960), British film maker
 Stephen Maguire (born 1981), Scottish professional snooker player
 Steve Maguire (contemporary), American software engineer and author
 Thomas Herbert Maguire (1821–1895) was an English artist and engraver
 Tobey Maguire (born 1975), American actor; best known for Spider-Man
 Tom Maguire (1892–1993), Irish Republican Army commandant-general

McGuire
Al McGuire (1928–2001), American college basketball coach & Basketball Hall of Fame inductee
Anne McGuire (born 1949), Scottish politician; MP for Stirling
Annie McGuire, Scottish broadcaster and talk-show presenter
Barry McGuire (born 1935), American singer and songwriter
Barry McGuire (born 1964), Louisiana author, painter and songwriter "Tales from Houma"
Bill McGuire (volcanologist), English professor of volcanology
Billy and Benny McCrary, Guinness World Record holders for "World's Heaviest Twins"
Brian McGuire (1945–1977), Australian race-car driver
Bruce McGuire (born 1962), Australian rugby league player
Casey McGuire (born 1980), Australian rugby league player
Cindy May McGuire (born 1996), Indonesian beauty pageant titleholder, Puteri Indonesia DKI Jakarta 5 and Puteri Indonesia 2022 contestant
Danny McGuire (born 1982), English rugby league player
Deacon McGuire (1863–1936), American professional baseball player, manager, and coach
Deck McGuire (born 1989), American professional baseball player
Dennis McGuire (disambiguation), multiple people
Dick McGuire (1926–2010), American professional basketball player and coach
Dominic McGuire, American professional basketball player
Dorothy McGuire (1916–2001), American actress
Eddie McGuire (born 1964), Australian television journalist, sportscaster, and game show host
Edith McGuire (born 1944), American Olympic athlete in sprinting events in the 1964 Olympics
Edward McGuire (composer) (born 1948), Scottish composer
Elijah McGuire (born 1994), American football player
Frank McGuire (1916–1994), American college basketball coach
Fred Henry McGuire, American Medal of Honor recipient
Gary McGuire (born 1938), English footballer
Hunter McGuire (1835–1900), American physician, teacher, and orator
Kathleen McGuire (born 1965), Australian-American musician (conductor, composer, educator)
Kathryn McGuire (1903–1978), American silent film actress and dancer
Kristen McGuire, American voice actress
Isaiah McGuire (born 2001), American football player
James McGuire (VC) (1827–1862), Irish recipient of the Victoria Cross
James Kennedy McGuire (1868–1923), American politician; mayor of Syracuse, New York
Jim McGuire (baseball coach), American college baseball coach
Joe McGuire (born 1944), Canadian politician; MP from Prince Edward Island
John McGuire (disambiguation), multiple people
Josh McGuire (born 1990), Australian Rugby League player
Maeve McGuire (born 1937), American soap opera actress
Matt McGuire (born 1993), Australian drummer, member of The Chainsmokers
Melanie McGuire (born 1972), American criminal who murdered her husband, dismembered his body and put it into suitcases
The McGuire Sisters (Christine, Dorothy, Phyllis), American singers (biological sisters)
Michael McGuire (disambiguation), multiple people
Molly McGuire, Canadian-American singer and songwriter
Nathan McGuire (born 2003), Irish cricketer
Patrick McGuire (disambiguation), multiple people
Patti McGuire (born 1951), American model; Playboy Playmate of the Year 1977
Paul McGuire (disambiguation), multiple people
Peter J. McGuire (1852–1906), American labor leader; important figure in the AFL
Phil McGuire (field hockey) (born 1970), British former field hockey player
Phil McGuire (footballer) (born 1980), Scottish footballer
Pierre McGuire (born 1961), American ice hockey analyst and sports commentator
Reba Rambo-McGuire, Christian singer and songwriter
Reese McGuire, American baseball player
Roger A. McGuire (1943–2005), American ambassador
Thomas McGuire (1920–1945), American WWII flying ace; eponym of McGuire AFB
Victor McGuire, English actor
William Anthony McGuire, American screenwriter and dramatist
William W. McGuire, American physician; former CEO of UnitedHealth Group

Fictional people
 Bren McGuire, player character from the Turrican video game series
 Father Dougal McGuire, character in the television series Father Ted
 Edward McGuire (economist), persona of comedian Charles Firth (comedian) of Australia
 Frankie McGuire, character from The Devil's Own
Jerry Maguire, titular character from the 1996 film of the same name
 Lizzie McGuire, title character of the TV series
 Dr. Jack McGuire, character in the television series Doogie Howser
 Rachel McGuire, character from Boy Meets World
 Sean MacGuire, character from the video game Red Dead Redemption 2

McGwire
 Two American sportspeople, fellow-siblings:
 Mark McGwire (born 1963), baseball player
 Dan McGwire (born 1967), football player

Kings of Fermanagh

See also
 County Fermanagh
 Clan MacQuarrie

References

Bibliography

External links
 Official website of Clan Maguire at Clan Maguire
 Mag-Uidhir at Family Tree DNA
 Maguires of Fermanagh at Library Ireland
 Maguire family pedigree at Library Ireland
 Cormac to Oirghiallaigh Magh Uidhir by Jim Maguire
 Report on the Pedigree of Terence Maguire by Sean Murphy
 The Maguires of Fermanagh

Surnames of Irish origin
Anglicised Irish-language surnames
English-language surnames
County Fermanagh
History of County Fermanagh
Ancient Irish dynasties
Irish families
Gaelic nobility of Ireland